Sardar Saker (1904–1973) was an Indian director who made several films in Iran. He owned his own film studio in Iran, Kuh-e Nur. He introduced Indian-style film narrative elements into Iranian films.

Filmography

1964 – A Night in Lalezar Avenue
1963 – Game for Anything
1962 – The Shore Is Not Far
1961 – Ali, the Shoe Shiner
1960 – Tomorrow Is Bright
1958 – A Ray of Hope
1956 – , featuring Mahvash
1954 – Morad

References

External links

1904 births
1973 deaths
Indian expatriates in Iran
20th-century Indian film directors
Iranian film directors